Ćosinac is a village in Požega-Slavonia County, Croatia. The village is administratively located in the Town of Pleternica.
According to national census of 2011, population of the village is 54.

Sources

Populated places in Požega-Slavonia County